Coronation of the Virgin is an oil on canvas painting by Domenico Beccafumi, executed c. 1539, now in the Pinacoteca nazionale in Siena.

Commissioned by the monks of Ognissanti in Siena, it was moved to Santo Spirito church after that church was destroyed and was only recently moved to the gallery. Unusually for the subject, its lower register shows not the apostles but three saints and pope, namely Mary Magdalene, Anthony of Padua, Pope Gregory XI and Catherine of Alexandria.

References

Beccafumi
1539 paintings
Paintings by Domenico Beccafumi
Paintings in the Pinacoteca Nazionale (Siena)
Paintings of Catherine of Alexandria
Paintings depicting Mary Magdalene
Paintings of Anthony of Padua